Henry Wills (born 1842, date of death unknown) was a United States Army soldier and a recipient of the United States military's highest decoration—the Medal of Honor—for his actions in the Indian Wars of the western United States.

Born in Gracon, Virginia, in 1842, Wills was living in St. Louis, Missouri, when he joined the Army. He served as a Private in Company C of the 8th Cavalry Regiment. He was cited for providing "[s]ervices against hostile Indians" near Fort Selden, New Mexico, from July 8, to July 11, 1873, and was awarded the Medal of Honor two years later, on August 12, 1875.

Medal of Honor citation
Rank and organization: Private, Company C, 8th U.S. Cavalry. Place and date: Near Fort Selden, N. Mex., 8-July 11, 1873. Entered service at. Pennsylvania. Birth: Gracon, Pa. Date of issue: August 12, 1875.

Citation:

Services against hostile Indians.

See also

List of Medal of Honor recipients for the Indian Wars

References

 

1842 births
Year of death missing
American people of the Indian Wars
United States Army Medal of Honor recipients
People from Virginia
United States Army soldiers
American Indian Wars recipients of the Medal of Honor